Ricardo Antonio Queraltó Alvarado (born 12 January 1976) is a Chilean former professional footballer who played as a forward.

Club career
A product of Unión Española youth system, Queraltó played for Unión Española, Deportes Linares, Colo-Colo, Santiago Morning and Deportes Melipilla.

Along with Unión Española, he won the 1999 Primera B de Chile and got promotion to the top division, after the club had been relegated in 1998. In the championship, he scored 21 goals.

He also had a stint with Italian club AC Arezzo in 2001. Previously, he had gone to China along with Gabriel Mendoza and the agent of Unión Española, Francisco Ugarte, to sign with Shandong Luneng, but just Mendoza joined the club and Queraltó returned to Chile after three months. In 2004, he also was with Mitra Kukar in 2004, where he coincided with Rodrigo Cuevas as fellow and Hernán Godoy as coach.

International career
Queraltó made two appearances for the Chile national team in 2000, scoring a goal against Guatemala on 5 February.

Coaching career
As a football coach, he has worked in the youth ranks of both Palestino and Unión Española.

Honours
Unión Española
 Primera B de Chile: 1999

References

External links
 
 
 Ricardo Queraltó at PlaymakerStats

1976 births
Living people
Footballers from Santiago
Chilean footballers
Chilean expatriate footballers
Chile international footballers
Unión Española footballers
Deportes Linares footballers
S.S. Arezzo players
Colo-Colo footballers
Santiago Morning footballers
Mitra Kukar players
Deportes Melipilla footballers
Primera B de Chile players
Chilean Primera División players
Serie C players
Chilean expatriate sportspeople in Italy
Chilean expatriate sportspeople in Indonesia
Expatriate footballers in Italy
Expatriate footballers in Indonesia
Association football forwards
Chilean football managers